The Men's 94 kg event at the 2010 South American Games was held over March 29 at 14:00.

Medalists

Results

References
Final

94kg M